Xestia atrata is a species of moth belonging to the family Noctuidae.

It is native to the Northern Hemisphere.

References

Xestia
Moths described in 1874